Israr Azeem Khan (born 2 August 1990) is an Indian cricketer who played for Uttar Pradesh. He made his first class debut in the 2015–16 Ranji Trophy on 15 October 2015. He made his List A debut on 10 December 2015 in the 2015–16 Vijay Hazare Trophy. He made his Twenty20 debut for Uttar Pradesh in the 2016–17 Inter State Twenty-20 Tournament on 5 February 2017.

References

External links
 
 

1990 births
Living people
Indian cricketers
Uttar Pradesh cricketers
People from Saharanpur